Acropora pharaonis is a species of acroporid coral that was first described by Milne-Edwards and Haime in 1860. It is classed as a vulnerable species on the IUCN Red List, and it has a decreasing population. It is common and found over a large area and is classified under CITES Appendix II.

Description
Acropora pharaonis is found in colonies of flat table-like structures, or simply in structures of clumped vertical or horizontal twisted branches. Brown-grey in colour with branches having pale tips, the branches become thinner towards the ends and contain many small branchlets, which contain axial, incipient axial, and radial corallites. The axial corallites, located on the ends of the branchlets, are small with outer diameters of between 1.5 and 2.6mm and inner diameters of 0.6-1.5mm. Incipient axial corallites frequently occur on the branchlets, giving them a spikey surface. The radial corallites are located in close proximity and contain small nose-shaped openings and randomly placed spinules. This species looks similar to Acropora clathrata, Acropora parapharaonis, and Acropora plumosa. Its mineralised tissue is composed of aragonite (calcium carbonate).

Distribution
Acropora pharaonis is common and found over a large range; the Indian Ocean, the Red Sea, the Persian Gulf, the Gulf of Aden, New Caledonia, Fiji, American Samoa, and potentially in Cocos-Keeling. It is threatened by climate change, coral disease, rising sea temperatures leading to bleaching, reef destruction, being prey to Acanthaster planci, and human activity. It is rated as a vulnerable species on the IUCN Red List, is listed CITES Appendix II, and could occur within Marine Protected Areas.

Taxonomy
It was first described by Haime and Henri Milne-Edwards in 1860 in genus Madrepora.

References

Acropora
Cnidarians of the Pacific Ocean
Fauna of the Indian Ocean
Fauna of the Red Sea
Marine fauna of Asia
Marine fauna of Oceania
Fauna of Southeast Asia
Vulnerable fauna of Asia
Vulnerable fauna of Oceania
Corals described in 1860
Taxa named by Henri Milne-Edwards
Taxa named by Jules Haime